Glynis Oliver, also credited as Glynis Wein, is an artist who has worked as a colorist in the comics industry. For several years, she was married to Len Wein. She returned to her maiden name in 1985.

Work
In the fall of 1972, Len Wein and writers Gerry Conway and Steve Englehart crafted a metafictional unofficial crossover spanning titles from both major comics companies. Each comic featured Englehart, Conway, and Len Wein, as well as Glynis Wein, interacting with Marvel or DC characters at the Rutland Halloween Parade in Rutland, Vermont. Beginning in Amazing Adventures #16 (by Englehart with art by Bob Brown and Frank McLaughlin), the story continued in Justice League of America #103 (by Len Wein, Dick Dillin and Dick Giordano), and concluded in Thor #207 (by Conway and penciler John Buscema).

Awards
She has been recognized for her work in the industry with a Shazam Award for Best Colorist in 1973.

Bibliography
Comics work includes (incomplete):

 2001: A Space Odyssey #4–5
 Adventure Comics  #457–459, 467–471, 473
 Amazing Adventures  #16, 17, 20
 Amazing Adventures Vol. 2 #1
 The Amazing Spider-Man  #127, 151–182, 184, 198, 200, 223–225, 228–230, 233, 235, 239, 241, 252–253, 255, Annual 13, Giant-Size 1–2
 Astonishing Tales  #1
 Avengers  #110, 119, 155
 Batman #308, 313–315, 317–319, 321–322
 Battlestar Galactica #5, 23
 Fantastic Four #137, 154–155, 161, 184–188, 190–192, 196, 203, 205, 208–209, 232–233, 236–237, 239–244, 246–248, 251–263, 265–306, 308–309, 316
 The Incredible Hulk (1962) #354-401, 403-432, 434-453
 Magik (Illyana and Storm) #1–3
 New Mutants  #1–5, 7–11, 13–15, 17–34, 37–39, 41, 43, 45–51, 53–60, 62, 64–73, 75–78, 80, 82–86, 88, 90
 New Mutants Annual #2–4
 Nova   #9, 12, 25
 Phoenix (1984) #1
 Power Man (1974) #17–19, 31, 62
 Power Pack  #1–10
 Prince Namor, The Submariner #1–2
 Rom #2, 16, 62
 Sabre #1
 Spectacular Spider-Man  #3, 45, 47, 60, 69–70, 84, 89, 91, 94
 Spider-Man Megazine #1, 3
 Spider-Woman  #1, 7, 24–25
 Star Wars  #5, 28, 39, 41–44, 46–47, 53–54, 56, 61, 64–70, 75–86, 89, 91–92
 Star-Lord Special #1
 Strange Tales  #169–174, 179
 Submariner  #60, 63–64, 69
 Superboy  #247
 Superman  #336–344
 Supernatural Thrillers #8, 10
 Thor  #208–210, 213, 219–220, 225, 242–248, 250–253, 255–271, 277–279, 284, 286, 288, 291, Annual 6–7
 Tomb of Dracula #8–9, 19–20, 57
 Uncanny X-Men #113–114, 116–133, 136–148, 150, 153, 155, 157–163, 166–168, 171–204, 206–235, 237–253, 255–260, 262–263, 267–272, 275, 279, 294, 300, Annual 3–8, 11–12, 17
 Untold Legend of the Batman #1–3
 Werewolf By Night  #5–8
 What If?  #2, 13, 18, 28, 32–33, 35
 Wolverine (1982) #1–6, 12–13, 15–18
 Worlds Unknown #4, 7

Notes

References

American female comics artists
Living people
Marvel Comics people
Place of birth missing (living people)
Year of birth missing (living people)